Bendigo Braves is a NBL1 South club based in Bendigo, Victoria, Australia. The club fields a team in both the Men's and Women's NBL1 South. The club is a division of the overarching Bendigo Braves Basketball Club, the major administrative basketball organisation in the region. The Braves play their home games at Bendigo Stadium.

Club history

Background
In 1981, a meeting was held between basketballers and basketball lovers that resulted in "The Braves" being formed. This group was trying to raise funds for the already existing Bendigo Braves and Lady Braves. The Braves were competing in the Victorian Country Championships, generally with mixed success. The teams were made up entirely of local Bendigo Basketball Association (BBA) players. There were no American imports, no sponsors, no player payments, players paid all expenses related to accommodation, transport, and meals and purchased their own tracksuits. Often when away at these championship weekends, the whole team would stay in a single room to keep costs low – there were BBA senior representative teams known as the Braves competing before 1981, but no "official" club had been formed. Well-known and respected basketball identity, Mr. Max Brisbane, had actually named the teams "The Braves" some years earlier.

By 1982, the club was more organised and had a growing membership. At the start of 1983, the club entered the 3rd division of the Victorian Basketball Association (VBA), with the intention of reaching 1st division in the near future. At that time, the VBA rules stipulated that teams must win a division title to be promoted to the next level and so the Braves were prepared for a long haul to the top. In the early days, the Braves played on court 7 & 8 at Albert Park Stadium. 1982 was not a particularly successful year with the team performing poorly in both competitions.

As a result, a crisis meeting was held to discuss the future direction of the club. Those present felt a professional coach was needed to lift the team to a higher standard. This was the club's first step into professional basketball and player payments. What was needed was to look further afield than Bendigo. If a top Melbourne coach could be found, his job would entail coaching weekly VBA Wednesday night games and travelling to Bendigo for additional training sessions on weekends. The number one choice for this position was dual Olympian, Mel Dalgleish. Within two weeks, Dalgleish had met with the club and association officials and outlined his vision for Bendigo basketball and the Braves. He saw the Braves competing in the VBA 1st division, the South Eastern Basketball League (SEBL) and ultimately into the National Basketball League (NBL). Dalgleish was convinced that the Braves would be so successful because of the unique assets of the City of Bendigo. The local television and radio stations, newspaper, the potential business support, the population base and the attraction of the La Trobe University were all elements which would combine to ensure future success. Dalgleish was appointed as player-coach of the Bendigo Braves and the Development Officer of the BBA within weeks.

Through Dalgleish's reputation as an Olympian and NBL player, the Braves were automatically accepted into the VBA 1st division for the 1984 season. The team continued to travel to Albert Park every Wednesday night. At this time, the Braves profile was further enhanced with Dalgleish's selection in the 1984 Los Angeles Olympic Team. This was the first time that a player not competing at NBL level had ever been selected.

At the end of 1984, the club took the significant step of applying to enter the SEBL. The entry process into the league was very involved and required a substantial financial commitment. Although the league was in its infancy, three teams had applied to take the one position available at that time, and competition for entry was fierce. A detailed submission was prepared and presented to the Annual General Meeting of the League, and after an extremely tense weekend the news came through; the Braves had become the first country team accepted into the SEBL.

Men's team
In 1985, the Bendigo Braves entered the SEBL for the first time. They missed the playoffs in their inaugural season under Mel Dalgleish, and for the 1986 season, he was replaced by Tom Flavin. Another year of missing the playoffs saw Flavin being replaced by David Flint in 1987. In Flint's second season as coach, the Braves not only won the South Conference title but also took out the 1988 National Championship. David Johnson's short but sweet career with the Braves was one of the club's most exceptional, as he averaged 47.8 points per game over 94 contests, including an individual scoring performance of 70 points against the Bulleen Boomers in the 1988 championship game. Two years later, Johnson and Flint led the Braves to another conference title, this time taking out the East Conference championship.

After 1990, the Braves were unable to attain championship success again until 2005, when the likes of Shawn Redhage and Jason Cameron led the Braves to the South Conference title and the National Championship. Redhage was named MVP of the conference grand final for his 43 points and 13 rebounds, while Cameron was named MVP of the ABA National Finals Grand Final. Two years later, the Braves repeated as South Conference champions after defeating the Kilsyth Cobras 74–63 in the SEABL South Grand Final. Jason Cameron was subsequently named Grand Final MVP.

In 2010 and 2011, the Braves were crowned back-to-back East Conference champions. In 2016, behind the play of import Jeremy Kendle, the Braves won their seventh conference title by taking out the East Conference championship. They went on to win the SEABL Championship after defeating the Mount Gambier Pioneers 79–61 in the final, with Kendle earning the Hugh McMenamin Medal as game MVP after scoring a game-high 34 points.

In 2019, the Braves reached the NBL1 grand final behind the likes of Ray Turner and Mathiang Muo, where they lost 99–90 to the Nunawading Spectres.

Women's team
Having joined the competition in 1990, the Lady Braves did not reach the playoffs until 1996 when Bernie Harrower took over as head coach. Just two years later, Bendigo began a dynasty that would span ten years and include five SEABL Championships and two ABA National Championships.

In 1998, Bendigo went 14–6 through the regular season, eventually losing to Kilsyth in the Grand Final. Making the All-Star team, Kerryn Henderson starred with 18.1 points a game alongside Emily McInerny who averaged a double-double with 10 points and 10.7 rebounds.

In their next season, the Lady Braves were almost unstoppable, with a record of 18–2 and revenge over Kilsyth in the Grand Final. In her first year with the club, Deanna Smith was superb, averaging 16.5 points and 5.3 rebounds. She was named in the All-Star team with McInerny while Harrower was awarded with his first Coach of the Year Award and an ABA Coach of the Year honour. The 2000 team was arguably the best of the dynasty as they took the ABA National Championship and defeated Nunawading in the Final after a 17–3 regular season record. Kristi Harrower won her first All-Star nomination with 16.7 points and 5 assists a game. Coach Harrower took home his second consecutive Coach of the Year award and off the bench Nina Shelton averaged 4.4 rebounds and 7 points. The Lady Braves were unable to complete the three-peat the following year, despite an 18–4 regular season record, falling short in the Grand Final. However, Karen Ashby emerged as an All-Star with 15 points and she pulled down almost a quarter of her team's rebounds, with 9.7 a game. Andrea Walsh also averaged 15 points to go along with 4 assists for the season.

Second place was again the result in 2002 after going 16–4 through the regular season, but Ashby was awarded her second consecutive All-Star nomination. Walsh top scored that season, including an average of 25 points through the playoffs. Success greeted Bendigo in 2003 with a 19–5 record and another defeat over Kilsyth in the Grand Final to go with another ABA National Championship. Walsh was named in the All Star team and after three solid years, awarded the MVP as well with 18 points and 7.1 rebounds a game. Walsh was complemented by Larissa Anderson who averaged 21 points in the playoffs and 1.5 blocks for the year. Bernie Harrower was also rewarded with his third Coach of the Year honour.

The following two years saw a decline in quality as Bendigo missed the playoffs with records of 7–14 and 11–11. Kristi Harrower and Michelle Fletcher were standouts in 2004 averaging 17 points each while Emma Randall emerged with 20 points a game in 2005. The highlight for the Lady Braves however was two more consecutive All Star inclusions for Karen Ashby, making her a 4-time All-Star selection.

Following the two lacklustre years, Bendigo responded in style with a victory over Ballarat in the 2006 Grand Final. Harrower top scored for the season with 18 points a game while Deanne Butler was stellar in the playoffs with an average of 19 points, 6 rebounds and 5 assists, while Coach Harrower received Coach of the Year honours for the fourth time. The final year of their dynasty saw the Lady Braves snare a fifth Championship, again beating Ballarat in the final. With a 19–7 record, Kelly Walker averaged 12 points through the regular season before Kristi Harrower took over in the post-season, sinking 45 points in two playoff matches.

Over the ten-year period, the Bendigo Lady Braves had a regular season record of 158–61, a playoffs record of 13–3 and an ABA record of 10–4 to finish with a win–loss ratio of 73%. Under head coach Bernie Harrower and with stars like Karen Ashby, Kristi Harrower and Kerryn Henderson, this dynasty was one of the best to ever play in the SEABL women's competition.

In 2018, the Lady Braves won their sixth SEABL championship with a 119–96 win over the Launceston Tornadoes in the grand final.

In 2022, the women's team reached the NBL1 South Grand Final, where they lost to the Ringwood Hawks.

References

External links
Bendigo Basketball's official website

South East Australian Basketball League teams
Basketball teams in Victoria (Australia)
Basketball teams established in 1985
Sport in Bendigo
1985 establishments in Australia